Orthaga vitialis is a species of snout moth in the genus Orthaga. It was described by Francis Walker in 1859. It is found in Sri Lanka.

References

Moths described in 1859
Epipaschiinae
Endemic fauna of Sri Lanka